Najmabad (also Romanized as Najmābād) is a village in Kakhk Rural District, Kakhk District, Gonabad County, Razavi Khorasan Province, Iran. At the 2006 census, its population was 112, in 39 families.

References 

Populated places in Gonabad County